Prairie Downs Station, often referred to as Prairie Downs, is a pastoral lease that operates as a cattle station.

The property was owned by Albert Leake in 1932. Leake still owned the property when he died in 1947 at 82 years of age. The Department of Lands advertised the  property in 1948 as being available for leasing.

An estimated 20,000 feral donkeys were roaming on Prairie Downs and neighbouring Bulloo Downs Stations in 1957.

In 1979 the property was running 877 cattle but is capable of carrying 2,590 cattle during a good season.

See also
List of ranches and stations

References

Pastoral leases in Western Australia
Stations (Australian agriculture)
Mid West (Western Australia)